Anoop Kumar Mendiratta (born 6 March 1963) is an Indian Judge. Presently, he is serving as Judge of Delhi High Court. Previously, he has served as Law Secretary of India.

Career 
He has served as district and sessions judge at North-East Delhi District Court. As a judge, Mendiratta headed the Motor Accidents Claim Tribunal, and served as a CBI special judge in 2012.

He also served as the Principal Secretary (Law) in the Government of the National Capital Territory of Delhi, during which he had disagreements with Delhi law minister Kailash Gahlot, resulting in his repatriation to his parent judicial cadre.

Law Secretary 
Mendiratta was appointed Secretary (Legal Affairs), heading the Department of Legal Affairs in the Ministry of Law and Justice, on deputation from the judicial service, by the Appointments Committee of the Cabinet, on the advice of a search-cum-selection committee, which interviewed more than 60people for the job. His appointment marked the first time a serving judge was appointed Law Secretary, breaking the earlier tradition of appointing Indian Legal Service officers to the post, although recruitment rules had always provided for the possibility of a serving district judge being appointed.

Judge 
Mendiratta was appointed Judge of Delhi High Court on 25 February 2022.

References 

21st-century Indian judges
Living people
Indian jurists
Indian civil servants
Place of birth missing (living people)
1963 births